Irom Maipak (20 August 1967 – 20 May 2021) was an Indian cinematographer from Imphal, Manipur. He was the founding president of the All Manipur Cinematographers Association. Maipak had worked for more than three decades in Films and Television industry. He received the prestigious National Film Award for Best Non-Feature Film Cinematography at the 49th National Film Awards.

He died from COVID-19 complications on 20 May 2021.

Career
Irom Maipak mastered the craft from Fulbright scholar, Ernest Gusella and Tomiyo Sasaki from United States and Aribam Syam Sharma. He had associated with renowned National Award winning filmmakers. His collaboration with Aribam Syam Sharma was marked by feature films namely Ashangba Nongjabi, Leipaklei and Nongphadok Lakpa Atithi and non-feature films such as Rajarshi Bhagyachandra, The Golden Hands and Raas Leelas of Manipur. Cheina, Thajabagee Wangmada, Nangtana Helli, Tellanga Mamei, Amamba Lambee were films of Oken Amakcham cinematographed by Maipak. He had worked with Haobam Paban Kumar in the documentaries Mr. India (2009), Nupishabi (2010), Phum Shang (2014) and the feature film Nine Hills One Valley (2020). Mr. India bagged the National Film Award for Best Film on Social Issues at the 57th National Film Awards. Phum Shang won the Best Investigative Film at the 62nd National Film Awards. He had also shot a short documentary titled Mother's Market: The Indian bazaar run entirely by women for BBC in 2015.

In 2016, he had worked with the filmmaker Bobo Khuraijam in the non-feature Ima Sabitri which was screened at many international film festivals. Leipaklei (2012) and Eigi Kona (2019) were movies filmed by Irom Maipak, which went on to win the National Film Award for Best Feature Film in Manipuri at the 60th National Film Awards and 67th National Film Awards respectively. He had also collaborated with the Assamese filmmaker Utpal Borpujari
in the 2016 movie Memories of a Forgotten War.

He documented the five forms of the Manipuri Raas Leela dance, namely Basanta Raas, Maha Raas, Kunja Raas, Diba Raas and Nitya Raas. It was directed by Aribam Syam Sharma for Sangeet Natak Akademi, New Delhi. Maipak had also worked as a cameraman in Asian News International (ANI) for three years. He was the director of photography for the Assamese movie Lefafa directed by Moirangthem Maniram Singha.

Accolades
Irom Maipak bagged the Best Videographer Award in the All Manipur Video Film Festival, 1993 for the feature film Kinepna Pahcha. He won the National Film Award for Best Non-Feature Film Cinematography in the non-feature section for the 2001 film The Monpas of Arunachal Pradesh at the 49th National Film Awards held in 2002. The citation for the National Award reads, "For his fascinating style of framing under uncontrolled situations". He was the recipient of the NETV People’s Choice Award 2005, Guwahati for the Best Cinematography.

In the  7th (2010) and 9th (2014) Manipur State Film Awards, for Mr. India and Phum Shang respectively, he won the Maibi Awards for Best Cinematography. Navroze Contractor Award for Best Documentary Cinematography was awarded to Irom Maipak for Phum Shang at the 8th International and Short Film Festival, Kerala. He bagged the Best Cinematography Award in the 8th Sahitya Seva Samiti MANIFA 2019 for Meitan Araba.

For the 2018 non-feature Raas Leelas of Manipur and the feature film Meitan Araba, he received the Best Cinematography Award in the 12th Manipur State Film Awards 2019. He also bagged the Best Cinematography Award at the 13th Manipur State Film Awards 2020 for the movie Nongphadok Lakpa Atithi. The citation for the award reads, "Almost every frame of the film Nongphadok Lakpa Atithi are created lyrically realistic with the insight of the cinematographer's creativity. His capacity for understanding the disposition, inclination or natural tendency and mood of the varied scenes and sequence is brought forth in harmonized tonality by the angling lenses to the cinematographic frames. For the reasons herewith, Shri Irom Maipak, the cinematographer of the film is conferred the Award for the Best Cinematographer".

Filmography
 Feature films

 Non-feature films

References

External links
 
 

People from Imphal
Meitei people
1967 births
2021 deaths
Indian cinematographers
Deaths from the COVID-19 pandemic in India